Radio Television of Kosovo (RTK;  is the public service broadcaster in Kosovo. RTK operates two radio services broadcasting a diverse programming of news and entertainment and four 24-hour television services broadcasting on terrestrial and satellite networks.

History

RTK replaced  (The Radio Television of Prishtina, RTP), which ceased to function in July 1990. After UNMIK took over the administration of Kosovo in June 1999 and re-employed former RTP staffs, RTK began broadcasting in September 1999 via analog satellite in PAL and SECAM television broadcast standards with a daily two-hour transmission, expanding to four hours per day in November 2000, with programming mainly in Albanian and once-a-day news edition in Serbian and Turkish. The following July, it expanded to seven hours a day and began offering programming in Bosnian as well.

In 2001, RTK was established as an independent public service broadcaster by a UNMIK broadcasting regulation. The station was initially managed by the European Broadcasting Union to permit time for a non-political Board of Directors to be established. This was in place and the station was independent of the EBU by the end of the year. In January 2002, an office was opened in Tirana, with a website launching in July. A second office was opened in Tetovo in November 2002.

In 2002, at which time it was broadcasting 15 hours a day, 35% of the station's broadcasts were produced externally, with the bulk of programming local. It included news and business coverage as well as farming information. Broadcasting remained multilingual, with programming in another language (the Romani language magazine “Yekhipe") beginning in September 2003. On 22 December of that year, the station began broadcasting 24 hours a day. Also in 2002, RTK began hosting awards, with the best news moderator being honored by the "Drita Germizaj" award and the best cameraman by the "Rudolf Sopi" award.

RTK's radio transmission began with the October 1999 acquisition of the multilingual public radio station "Radio Prishtina", which became "Radio Kosovo". In 2000, it acquired the multi-ethnic UN youth radio station Radio Blue Sky.

In 2013, RTK introduced a new logo and a newly corporate identity for the first time of 14 years since 1999. By that, the grey-coloured 1-numeral along with the red letter R, the white letter T, and the yellow letter K are all replaced by something brand new that is the RTK wordmark which is coloured blue, but it has the letter K being put inside a half square. At the same time, RTK's TV services were expanded to include a channel called RTK 2, which is intended to focus on minorities, and with it, all minority language programming were moved from RTK 1 to RTK 2.

By 2014, RTK saw the launch of two new stations such as RTK 3 which is a news channel and RTK 4 which is an arts and documentary channel.

Journalists at RTK have repeatedly protested in 2015 against political interference, up to asking for the dismissal of chief editors for obstruction and internal censorship.

Management 

RTK is regulated by the Law on Public Broadcasting. Its financing was originally guaranteed by a license fee paid over electricity bill, until the Constitutional Court declared that it was not due and shifted RTK's budget over state subsidy (0.7% of Kosovo's budget). The change raised concerns for the preservation of RTK's independence. The legal requirement for RTK to plan an end to the transitional state budget funding has not been enacted. 

RTK has been criticised for lack of investigative journalism and political bias, e.g. in the extensive coverage of the ruling political party (including the annual meeting of the ruling Democratic Party of Kosovo) as opposed to the short and misleading coverage of opposition Vetëvendosje 2012 protests, which was deemed "a major signal of state financing putting the editorial independence of public television at risk" (IREX, 2013b). Moreover, RTK coverage only reaches 62.7% of Kosovo's territory

RTK Board members are elected by the Parliament by majority vote, thus entrusting their appointment to the majority parties. Political pressures aside, RTK maintains an untapped potential thanks to good equipment and professional editors and journalists.

See also
 List of radio stations in Kosovo
 Television in Kosovo

Notes

References

External links

 Radio Televizioni i Kosovës Official Website
 News about Radio Television of Kosovo

Television stations in Kosovo
Television stations in Serbia
Radio stations in Kosovo
Radio stations in Serbia
Multilingual broadcasters
Television channels and stations established in 1999
1999 establishments in Kosovo